Bashar Mounzer Rahal (born 20 October 1974) is a Bulgarian actor.

Life and career

Early life
Bashar Rahal was born in Dubai, UAE, the son of Lebanese father Mounzer Rahal and Bulgarian mother Mariana Rahal. His sister, Carla Rahal, also an actress, is mostly known for her roles in the National Theater of Bulgaria. Carla is also a pop and R&B singer, songwriter, and producer. She is best known for two of Bulgaria's most popular songs, "Lie to Me" and "I Wish U".

The family moved from UAE to Bulgaria when Bashar was only six years old. He first started acting in TV sketches when he was 12. At the age of 13 he became a member of Tears and Laughs, a professional theater group, with which he took part in more than 15 performances. He also attended numerous international film and theater festivals, including the ones in Avignon, France and Thun, Switzerland.

His first major film role was in 1989, in the controversial at that time Ivan and Alexandra. The film tells the story of two madly in love students in communist Bulgaria. The movie is also a winner of the 1989 Golden Rose Film Festival in Varna. This role was followed by his part in the 1992 movie Bad Boy.

Early career
His professional acting career began in 1992 when Bashar was accepted at the National Academy of Theater and Film Art (in the class of professor Stefan Danailov, Minister of Culture of Bulgaria during 2005–2009), where he got his master's degree in Performing Arts. During that time he took part in numerous TV and film productions as well as several commercials. Shortly after graduation he was accepted as a permanent member of the National Youth Theater.

Professional career
For the next couple of years Bashar appeared in over 25 different TV comedy shows, but his popularity came with the TV show It Can't Be, which was created & directed by Nellie Andreeva - currently an editor for The Hollywood Reporter. It Can't Be was on air for 7 seasons and became one of the highest rated comedy shows in Bulgaria. Similar to Saturday Night Live, It Can't Be was a weekly 40-minute comedy-variety show. Bashar was not only one of the creators of the show, he was also the lead actor, writer, producer and occasionally a director.

Bashar Rahal is also dubbed as the creator of the first ever night show in Bulgaria, where he met his co-host and future wife Kalina Rahal. In 1997, only 22 years old, he became part of the Award-winning anchor team of It Has Began - the highest rated morning show in Bulgaria (executive producer-Mihail Mihailov-after an extensive television career he became the Press Secretary for the Prime Minister of Bulgaria Ivan Kostov). The same year Bashar Rahal also appeared in two Italian productions, the 1997 TV Movie In Fondo Al Cuore and in the mini series Racket alongside Italian actor and director Michele Placido. In 1999 he was cast by the film director Egon Günther for the film Else - Geschichte einer leidenschaftlichen Frau.

New beginning

In 1999 he decided to follow his childhood dream, and immigrated to the United States and settled in California to pursue his acting career. Kalina and Bashar settled in San Diego, where the couple lived for the next six years. During that period Rahal appeared in several US feature films, including the 1999 movie Bridge of Dragons, where he plays alongside Dolph Lundgren. In 2001 he starred as Dmitri Minkov in Operation Delta Force 4: Deep Fault directed by Mark Roper. City of Fear is Rahal's next feature, where he plays opposite Gary Daniels.

In 2006 the family relocated their home to Los Angeles. Shortly afterward, Bashar took part in few major film and TV productions. Some of the projects include a guest role in the critically acclaimed Emmy Award-winning Fox TV series Arrested Development, created by Mitchell Hurwitz and two-time Academy Award-winning American actor, film director, and producer Ron Howard.

Bashar attracted broader public attention with a supporting role in the 2006 BBC Drama/Documentary Hannibal, where he played Hasdrubal, the brother of Hannibal, played by Alexander Siddig (24, Syriana and Kingdom of Heaven).

Bashar Rahal also played in the 2008 movie War, Inc., directed by Joshua Seftel. Among the star cast are three Academy Award winners - Ben Kingsley, Marisa Tomei and Joan Cusack. The lead roles are played by John Cusack, who is also a writer and producer of the movie, and Hilary Duff.

In 2017 Bashar stars in the fifth season of the Bulgarian TV show Kato Dve Kapki Voda.

Personal life
In 1997, on the set of Late Night Show, Bashar met his co-host and future wife Kalina. After arriving in San Diego, in 1999, Kalina started working as a news producer for KUSI-TV.

In 2002 the couple got married in La Jolla, California.

After moving from San Diego to Los Angeles in 2006, Kalina became a producer for KTLA Morning Show.

Kalina and Bashar have two daughters, Chloe and India Rahal.

Filmography

References

External links
 
 Bashar Rahal on ManPaper.com
  (in Bulgarian)

1974 births
Living people
Bulgarian male film actors
Bulgarian male stage actors
Bulgarian male television actors
21st-century Bulgarian male actors
People from Dubai
Bulgarian people of Lebanese descent
Bulgarian expatriates in the United States
American people of Bulgarian descent
American people of Lebanese descent
20th-century Bulgarian male actors